Dennis Mims (born October 15, 1980) is an American professional basketball player. He assumes Turkish citizenship. He joined Beşiktaş Cola Turka for 2008-09 season. Played in Eurocup, Baltic cup, Asian and Balkan cup competitions.

References

External links 
TBLStat.net Profile
Legadue Profile

1980 births
Living people
African-American basketball players
American expatriate basketball people in China
American expatriate basketball people in Colombia
American expatriate basketball people in Estonia
American expatriate basketball people in Finland
American expatriate basketball people in Germany
American expatriate basketball people in Italy
American expatriate basketball people in Lithuania
American expatriate basketball people in Poland
American expatriate basketball people in Qatar
Astoria Bydgoszcz players
OGM Ormanspor players
American expatriate basketball people in Turkey
Basketball players from South Carolina
BC Tallinn Kalev players
Beşiktaş men's basketball players
Dakota Wizards (CBA) players
İstanbul Teknik Üniversitesi B.K. players
Tampereen Pyrintö players
IUP Crimson Hawks men's basketball players
TED Ankara Kolejliler players
Virginia Tech Hokies men's basketball players
American men's basketball players
Power forwards (basketball)
21st-century African-American sportspeople
20th-century African-American people